The 1972 Old Dominion 500 was a NASCAR Winston Cup Series racing event that was held on September 24, 1972, at Martinsville Speedway in Martinsville, Virginia.

The race car drivers still had to commute to the races using the same stock cars that competed in a typical weekend's race through a policy of homologation (and under their own power). This policy was in effect until roughly 1975. By 1980, NASCAR had completely stopped tracking the year model of all the vehicles and most teams did not take stock cars to the track under their own power anymore.

Background
Martinsville Speedway is one of five short tracks to hold NASCAR races. The track's turns are banked at eleven degrees, while the front stretch, the location of the finish line, is banked at zero degrees. The back stretch also has a zero degree banking.

Race report
Five hundred laps were done on a paved track spanning  in a time of three hours and forty-five minutes. Richard Petty would defeat Bobby Allison by a time of six seconds in front of 31,000 live audience members; making this race the closest Bobby Allison ever came to winning at Martinsville. Although Cecil Gordon had a competitive finish of 10th place during this event, his lackluster performance during the 1972 NASCAR Winston Cup Series season would eventually cost him a shot at winning the championship.

Exactly ten minutes from the race along with a flyover by the local military jets were used in the 1973 American film The Last American Hero. While Richard Petty and Bobby Allison got filmed most of the time, a moment involving Ray Hendrick's #2 vehicle crashing on lap 311 was also a notable event during the filming.

The average speed of the race, however, would be a mere . Eight cautions slowed the race for 58 laps in the entire race. All thirty-six of the qualifying drivers on the grid were male and born somewhere in the United States of America. Originally, 56 drivers auditioned for this race; including Joe Frasson, who was one of the ones who failed to qualify. Bill Shirey would be the unfortunate last-place finisher due to an overheating issue on lap 19. Fred Lorenzen would retire from NASCAR after this race. This was also LeeRoy Yarbrough's last race, never to be heard from again until his death. He ran most of the last two seasons in non-competitive cars yet he was one of the most fearless racers ever.

Richard Petty would go on to win the championship shortly after this race was over while Bobby Allison would find a new employer named Ralph Moody for the 1973 NASCAR Winston Cup Series season. The total purse of this racing event was $46,650 ($ when considering inflation); the first-place finisher received $7,350 ($ when considering inflation) while the last-place finisher received $425 ($ when considering inflation).

Six of NASCAR's most notable crew chiefs were on attendance for this race; including Harry Hyde, Dale Inman, Vic Ballard and Lee Gordon.

Technological concerns
Improvements in tire and engine technology in the early 1970s had made NASCAR Cup Series vehicles overpowered compared to the limited space that Martinsville Speedway had for breathing space. Further technological advancements by 2013 have caused further concern for driver safety at Martinsville; indicating that the Monster Energy NASCAR Cup Series may have to use restrictor plates in Martinsville if tire/engine technology keeps its current pace of development.

Qualifying

Finishing order
Section reference:

Timeline
Section reference: 
 Start: Bobby Allison was leading the starting grid as the green flag was waved.
 Lap 19: Bill Shirey and Bobby Isaac jointly overheated their vehicles.
 Lap 77: Larry Smith blew his vehicle's engine.
 Lap 88: Richard Childress caused the rear end of his vehicle to become dangerously loose.
 Lap 95: Frank Warren caused the rear end of his vehicle to become dangerously loose.
 Lap 105: Bill Dennis caused terminal vehicle damage.
 Lap 108: LeeRoy Yarbrough caused terminal vehicle damage; Dave Marcis caused the rear end of his vehicle to become dangerously loose.
 Lap 132: Richard Petty took over the lead from Bobby Allison.
 Lap 134: Dean Dalton overheated his vehicle.
 Lap 148: Bobby Allison took over the lead from Richard Petty.
 Lap 216: Fred Lorenzen blew his vehicle's engine.
 Lap 221: David Pearson took over the lead from Bobby Allison.
 Lap 222: Bobby Allison took over the lead from David Pearson.
 Lap 223: David Pearson took over the lead from Bobby Allison.
 Lap 225: Bobby Allison took over the lead from David Pearson.
 Lap 272: Tiny Lund caused the rear end of his vehicle to become dangerously loose.
 Lap 279: David Pearson took over the lead from Bobby Allison.
 Lap 280: Bobby Allison took over the lead from David Pearson.
 Lap 311: Ray Hedrick caused terminal vehicle damage.
 Lap 328: David Ray Boggs blew his vehicle's engine.
 Lap 369: Henley Gray overheated his vehicle.
 Lap 436: Richard Petty took over the lead from Bobby Allison.
 Lap 441: Bobby Allison took over the lead from Richard Petty.
 Lap 442: Richard Petty took over the lead from Bobby Allison.
 Lap 446: Bobby Allison took over the lead from Richard Petty.
 Lap 459: John Sears' vehicle developed problems with its transmission.
 Lap 462: Richard Petty took over the lead from Bobby Allison.
 Finish: Richard Petty was officially declared the winner of the race.

References

Old Dominion 500
Old Dominion 500
NASCAR races at Martinsville Speedway